Lakambini "Neneth" Generans Reluya is a Filipino politician from San Fernando, Cebu, Philippines. She currently serves as the mayor of San Fernando. Reluya's husband, Ricardo Reluya, Jr., filed his candidacy for vice mayor in the 2019 elections but was killed in an ambush on January 22, 2019. Their son, Ricci Regen Reluya, was placed in as a substitute and eventually won as vice mayor.

References

External links
 

Living people
Nacionalista Party politicians
Year of birth missing (living people)